The Battle of Beler was one of the major battles of the Dominican War of Independence and was fought on the 27 November 1845 at the Beler savanna, Monte Cristi Province. A force of Dominican troops, a portion of the Army of the North, led by General Francisco Antonio Salcedo, defeated a force of the Haitian Army led by General Jean-Louis Pierrot, while 3 Dominican schooners led by Admiral Juan Bautista Cambiaso, blockaded the port of Cap-Haïtien to prevent sea reinforcements of the near sited land battle.

Notes

References
 

Beler
Beler
Beler
1845 in the Dominican Republic
November 1845 events